The 1920 Yugoslav Women's Basketball League is the 6th season of the Yugoslav Women's Basketball League, the highest professional basketball league in Yugoslavia for women's. Championships is played in 1949 played nine teams. Champion for this season is Crvena zvezda.

Regular season

Group A

Group B

Play Off

External links
 History of league

Yugoslav Women's Basketball League seasons
Women
1950 in women's basketball
basketball